Anorectal anomalies are congenital malformations of the anus and rectum. One anal anomaly, imperforate anus has an estimated incidence of 1 in 5000 births. It affects boys and girls with similar frequency.

Examples of anorectal anomalies include:
 Anal stenosis
 Proctitis
 Anal bleeding
 Anal fistula

See also 
 Imperforate anus

References 

Colorectal surgery
Congenital disorders
Rare diseases